The Winner is an American period sitcom created by Ricky Blitt that premiered on Fox on March 4, 2007. It is about a successful 43½-year-old man named Glen Abbott (portrayed by Rob Corddry) looking back to the time when he was in his 30s and living with his parents in 1994 Buffalo, New York.

Other cast members include Erinn Hayes as Alison, Keir Gilchrist as Alison's son, Josh, Lenny Clarke as Glen's father, Ron and Linda Hart as Glen's mother, Irene. The sitcom is produced by Ricky Blitt and Seth MacFarlane, who are also producers of Family Guy.

The working title of this series was Becoming Glen. A pilot was made for Fox in 2002 starring Johnny Galecki as Glen. It also starred Samantha Mathis, Gerald McRaney and Sally Struthers. The pilot was not picked up. However, the resurgence of Family Guy and the success of The 40-Year-Old Virgin in 2005 helped Blitt get a chance at making another pilot.

At Family Guy Live in Montreal on July 21, 2007, Seth MacFarlane said "It is looking like there could be a future life for The Winner." However, the series was officially cancelled on May 16, 2007.

Characters
 Glen Abbott (Rob Corddry): A successful 43½-year-old man who looks back at when he was 31 and living with his parents. He had only just lost his virginity at 31 to his former English teacher. He also was trying to date his neighbor, Alison McKeller and made friends with her son, Josh McKeller.
 Ron Abbott (Lenny Clarke): The disappointed father of Glen Abbott and unhappy husband of Irene Abbott. His personality is comparable to Frank Barone of Everybody Loves Raymond or Frank Costanza of Seinfeld, although to a lesser degree.
 Josh McKeller (Keir Gilchrist): The son of Alison McKeller and friend of Glen Abbott. Glen and Josh are friends separated by several years of age leading to an unexpected friendship. Glen usually helps Josh with his relationship problems.
 Irene Abbott (Linda Hart): The loving mother of Glen. She appears to be much more supportive of Glen than her husband and is usually willing to help with dilemmas.
 Alison McKeller (Erinn Hayes): The mother of Josh and friend of Glen. Glen's exploits usually involve maintaining a relationship with her sometimes with Josh's help.

Reception
With a Metacritic rating of 44/100, critical reaction was mostly negative. Labeled "dreadful" by the Miami Herald and "abrasive" by The New York Times, the show was widely criticized in the media and by audiences for its overuse of an overly-loud, "onerous" laugh track. Some reviewers, however, responded to the show's quirks; the New York Post described it as "the funniest new show this season." Ratings were dismal from the outset and only fell with each episode and Fox cancelled the show after only three weeks on the air.

Episodes

U.S. television ratings

Weekly rankings based on The Winner ratings.

* Represents the average rating for Fox in the 9pm hour (which The Winner shared with Family Guy)

Key: Rating is the estimated percentage of all TVs tuned to the show, share is the percentage of all TVs in use that are tuned in. Viewers is the estimated number of actual people watching, in millions, while ranking is the approximate ranking of the show against all prime-time TV shows for the week (Monday through the following Sunday).

References

External links
 
 The Winner at The Futon Critic

2007 American television series debuts
2007 American television series endings
2000s American sitcoms
Television shows set in Buffalo, New York
Fox Broadcasting Company original programming
Television series set in the 1990s
Television series by Fuzzy Door Productions
Television series by 20th Century Fox Television